Imigen Island is an uninhabited island in the Qikiqtaaluk Region of Nunavut, Canada. It is located in Baffin Island's Cumberland Sound. Ivisa Island lies to its west, Saunik Island to its northwest. Aupaluktok Island, Beacon Island, the Drum Islands, Ekallulik Island, Iglunga Island, the Kaigosuit Islands, the Kaigosuiyat Islands, and the Sanigut Islands are in the vicinity.

References

External links 
 Imigen Island in the Atlas of Canada - Toporama; Natural Resources Canada

Islands of Baffin Island
Islands of Cumberland Sound
Uninhabited islands of Qikiqtaaluk Region